John Kennel Sr. Farm was a registered historic building near Trenton, Ohio, listed in the National Register on 1984-08-03.  It has since been torn down.

It was a two-story "Amish/Mennonite type" house with a gable-and-hip roof.  The front entryway had a transom, and inside was a stairway with cherry handrail and square posts. The property included a bank barn, a brick smokehouse, a corn crib, and an "early" chicken house.
 
It was home of John Kennel Sr., an Amish person, and his wife Anna Augspurger Kennel, who was of the Hessian Amish people who came to the area in 1832.

See also
 John Kennel Jr. Farm

References

Houses on the National Register of Historic Places in Ohio
Houses in Butler County, Ohio
National Register of Historic Places in Butler County, Ohio